The 1951 All-SEC football team consists of American football players selected to the All-Southeastern Conference (SEC) chosen by various selectors for the 1951 college football season. Georgia Tech and Tennessee shared the conference title. The Associated Press selection had two platoons.

All-SEC selections

Offense

Ends
Steve Meilinger, Kentucky (College Football Hall of Fame)  (AP, UP-1)
Harry Babcock, Georgia (AP, UP-3)
Ben Roderick, Vanderbilt (UP-1)
Red Lutz, Alabama (UP-2)
Buck Martin, Georgia Tech (UP-2)
Lee Hayley, Auburn (UP-3)

Tackles
Bob Werckle, Vanderbilt (AP, UP-2)
Lum Snyder, Georgia Tech (AP)
Charlie LaPradd, Florida (UP-2)
Jerome Helluin, Tulane (UP-3)
Bill Pyron, Miss. St. (UP-3)

Guards
John Michels, Tennessee (College Football Hall of Fame) (AP, UP-3)
Gene Donaldson, Kentucky (AP)
Sid Fournet, LSU (UP-2)
Foots Bauer, Auburn (UP-2)
John Ignarski, Kentucky (UP-3)

Centers
Doug Moseley, Kentucky (AP, UP-1)
Gordon Poinfsky, Tennessee (UP-2)
Ralph Carrigan, Alabama (UP-3)

Quarterbacks
Babe Parilli, Kentucky (AP, UP-1)
Darrell Crawford, Georgia Tech (AP, UP-1)
Bill Wade, Vanderbilt (AP, UP-2)
Zeke Bratkowski, Georgia (UP-3)

Backs
Hank Lauricella, Tennessee (College Football Hall of Fame)  (AP, UP-1)
Andy Kozer, Tennessee (UP-2)
Leon Hardeman, Georgia Tech (UP-2)
Haywood Sullivan, Florida (UP-3)
Jimmy ?, Ole Miss (UP-3)
Herky Payne, Tennessee (UP-3)

Defense

Ends
Doug Atkins, Tennessee (AP)
Harold Maxwell, Ole Miss (AP)

Tackles
Pug Pearman, Tennessee (AP, UP-1)
Lamar Wheat, Georgia Tech (AP, UP-1)

Guards
Ted Daffer, Tennessee (AP, UP-1)
Ray Beck, Georgia Tech (College Football Hall of Fame)  (AP, UP-1)

Centers
George Tarasovic, LSU (AP)

Backs

Bobby Marlow, Alabama (AP, UP-1)
Bert Rechichar, Tennessee (AP, UP-2)
Joe Fortunato, Mississippi State. (AP)
Claude Hipps, Georgia (AP)

Key

AP = Associated Press

UP = United Press

Bold = Consensus first-team selection by both AP and UP

See also
1951 College Football All-America Team

References

All-SEC
All-SEC football teams